Günter Lorenz (born 1964 or 1965 in Wels) is an Austrian murderer.

Double murder 
On February 15, 1983, the bodies of 43-year-old Sieglinde Eckert and her eldest daughter, 18-year-old Ursula, were found in Ungargasse 12 in Landstraße. A police doctor found that both women were killed with headshots from a rifle loaded with explosive bullets. The bodies of the dead were so disfigured that officials were initially unable to distinguish between mother and daughter, with only the younger daughters being able to identify the two.

Despite questioning all the neighbours, nobody had seen an armed man or heard a shot. There were no signs of a break-in at the apartment door, which led investigators to believe that the victims might have known the offender and opened the door for him. The questioning of a friend of Ursula's brought the officials onto something. She said that she had talked to Ursula shortly before the murder, saying that she had recently been visited by her ex-boyfriend Paul and that he had a weapon with him. But because he was scary, she broke off contact with him. The police investigated Paul, who turned out to be Günter Lorenz. He was 18 years old, had just passed his exams with distinction and lived in a Vienna caretaker's apartment. In the first interrogations, he denied having anything to do with the murders until the investigators found personal belongings of the victims in his home. He then said that he had wanted to rob his ex-girlfriend, but did not dare to do it alone. That's why he asked his 16-year-old Peter Daubinger to accompany him. However, he had brought a weapon, shot the two women and had fled with the loot. Since Daubinger was untraceable, the police initiated a search for him and warned of his dangerousness. In the meantime, Daubinger was presented as the true culprit in the media.

Confessions and sentencing 

After two days of interminable interrogations, Lorenz began to contradict himself. It was then ascertained that Lorenz and Daubinger could never, as stated by Lorenz, have stolen 10,000, but a maximum of 2,000 shillings, and thus Daubinger could have stolen the 8,000 other shillings. Finally, Lorenz confessed to having shot the two women himself. He used a Gewehr 98 with explosive ammunition, normally used for big game hunting. He had bought the ammo in a Viennese gun shop. In order to be able to wear it concealed, he had sawn off the piston and used a piece of carpet as a silencer. After a few hours, he finally confessed to the murder of his cousin, whom was killed with three shots and then beheaded on February 9 in an abandoned construction site on the banks of the Danube near Reichsbrücke, in order to make it harder to identify. Lorenz then led the investigators to Daubinger's body, which he had buried under a snowdrift on Donauinsel.

The extreme cold-blooded and unrepentant nature of the 18-year-old not only astonished the investigators, but later led to the imposition of the maximum penalty. Just before he wrote a confession, he asked with a smile if he could start studying and practising sport in jail, and learned about the choice of books in detention centers. He also gave no comprehensible motive to date and said only that he did not like the three victims and thought they conspired against him. At first he even tried to portray Daubinger's killing as self-defense. The police assume he murdered his victims out of pure lust for killing.

Despite having a notable personality disorder and mental dysfunction to a great extent, he was declared sane. Docent Dr. Willibald Sluga from the Department of Psychiatry said that he did not know a single crime that was comparable to it and that it was committed by a mental patient. Prosecutor Ernst Kloyber "has not experienced such crimes in 15 years of work experience" and demanded the maximum penalty, while Lorenz's defender Gunther Gahleitner cited the accused's poor childhood and wanted for him not be condemned, but be sent to a mental institution. The last words of the defendant were: "My defender is psychotic."

On March 14, 1984, Günter Lorenz was sentenced to 20 years imprisonment by presiding Justice Paul Weiser and was sent to a mental institution. In 2004, his dismissal was prevented by a psychiatric report, whereupon he began rampaging in Mittersteig Prison, threatening a psychologist and smashing furniture. He was overwhelmed by seven officials and was later transferred to the Stein Prison.

Impact 
The character murder of Daubinger triggered outrage. His picture was published in the newspapers and he was named a "murderer", "double murderer" and "killer", based solely on Lorenz's statements. His affiliation to the right-wing scene and his alleged obsession with weapons proved completely unfounded. Many newspapers then published a letter of apology in their daily editions, in which they accused themselves of the media's judicial murder.

The book and film rights for Lorenz was secured by Stern magazine. The price guaranteed him the coverage of his lawyer's fees.

The murders also triggered a political discussion about the weapons law. The two deputies to the National Council Robert Lichal and Harald Ofner called for a tightening of the weapons law, while Interior Minister Erwin Lanc and deputy Hans Hobl emphasized that laws alone cannot prevent such bloody acts. It was criticized that there are strict requirements for the acquisition of handguns, but extremely liberal for the acquisition of long guns such as pump action shotguns and carbines. However, with the introduction of a firearms license, more than 1.2 million gun owners would have to be prosecuted, and then an increase in the illegal arms trade was feared, so the laws remained untouched.

The murder weapon, together with original newspaper reports, can be seen in the Vienna Crime Museum.

In addition, the case of Günter Lorenz was examined in the book Traces of Evil.

References

External links 
 

Year of birth missing (living people)
Austrian people convicted of murder
Living people
1960s births
People with personality disorders